Media blackout is the censorship of news related to a certain topic, particularly in mass media, for any reason. A media blackout may be voluntary, or may in some countries be enforced by the government or state. The latter case is controversial in peacetime, as some regard it as a human rights violation and repression of free speech. Press blackout is a similar phrase, but refers specifically to printed media.

Media blackouts are used, in particular, in times of declared war, to keep useful intelligence from the enemy. In some cases formal censorship is used, in others the news media may cooperate, as in the UK D- (later DA-)Notice system in the Second World War.

Examples

Historical
Some examples of media blackout would include the media bans of southern Japan during the droppings of the atomic bombs on Hiroshima and Nagasaki, and the lack of independent media correspondence from Iraq during the Persian Gulf War.

During World War II, the US Office of Censorship sent messages to newspapers and radio stations, which were acted on by recipients, asking them not to report any sightings or explosions of fire balloons, so the Japanese would have no information on the balloons' effectiveness when planning future actions. As a result, the Japanese learned the fate of only one of their bombs, which landed in Wyoming, but failed to explode. The Japanese stopped all launches after less than six months. The press blackout in the U.S. was lifted after the first deaths from fire balloons, to ensure that the public was warned, though public knowledge of the threat could have possibly prevented the deaths. News of the loss of over 4,000 lives when UK ship RMS Lancastria was sunk during the war was voluntarily suppressed to prevent it affecting civilian morale, but was published after it became known overseas.

GHQ in Japan, occupation after WWII 
Above the political and economic control that Supreme Commander for the Allied Powers (SCAP) had for the seven years following Japan's surrender, SCAP also had strict control over all of the Japanese media, under the formation of the Civil Censorship Detachment (CCD) of SCAP. The CCD eventually banned a total of 31 topics from all forms of media. 

These topics included:Criticism of SCAP (individuals and the organization).　Criticism of Allied policy pre- and post-war.　Any form of imperial propaganda. Defense of war criminals. Praise of "undemocratic" forms of government, though praise of SCAP itself was permitted. The atomic bombings of Hiroshima and Nagasaki.
Black market activities. Open discussion of allied diplomatic relations (Soviet Union–United States relations). Although some of the CCD censorship laws considerably relaxed towards the end of SCAP, some topics, like the atomic bombings of Hiroshima and Nagasaki, were taboo until 1952 at the end of the occupation.

Contemporary
In Nassau County, New York, on July 4, 1956, a 32-day-old baby named Peter Weinberger was kidnapped and held for $2,000 ransom; the kidnapper promised to return Weinberger "safe and happy" if his demand was met. Police arranged for the kidnapper to retrieve the money at a corner near Weinberger's home and requested a media blackout to reduce the risk of the kidnapper harming Peter before the exchange. The New York Daily News reported on the kidnapping anyway, drawing heavy press attention to Weinberger's house and scaring the kidnapper out of retrieving the ransom money. The kidnapper then abandoned Weinberger in some heavy brush off a highway exit. Weinberger was found dead a month later, having died of infant exposure.

A media blackout was used during the 2005 New York City transit strike to allow for more effective contract negotiation between the two sides of the dispute.

The 2008 abduction of Canadian journalist Mellissa Fung was given a media blackout to assure her safe return. All media sources obliged making the Canadian public unaware of the fate of Fung.

In 2008, the fact that Prince Harry, then third in line to the British throne, was serving on active duty in Afghanistan was subject to a blackout in the British media for his own safety. He was brought home early after the blackout was broken by foreign media.

On 22 June 2009, when news came that New York Times reporter David Rohde had escaped from his Taliban captors, few knew he had even been kidnapped, because for the seven months he and two Afghan colleagues were in the Taliban's hands, The Times kept that information under wraps. Out of concern for the reporter's safety, The Times asked other major news organizations to do the same; NPR was among dozens of news outlets that did not report on the kidnapping at the urging of Rohde's colleagues. Kelly McBride, who teaches ethics to journalists at the Poynter Institute, says she was "really astounded" by the media blackout.  "I find it a little disturbing, because it makes me wonder what else 40 international news organizations have agreed not to tell the public," she tells NPR's Melissa Block.  McBride says the blackout could hurt the credibility of news organizations.  "I don't think we do ourselves any favors long term for our credibility when we have a total news blackout on something that's clearly of interest to the public," she says.

In association football

In association football, a press or media blackout is also referred to as a silenzio stampa (literally press silence) from the corresponding Italian phrase. It specifically refers to when a football club or national team and the players refuse to give interviews or in any other way cooperate with the press, often during important tournaments, or when the club feels that the media does not depict the club and their activities in an objective way. The phrase silenzio stampa was born during the 1982 FIFA World Cup, when the Italian team created a news blackout due to rumors and untrue stories circulating in the press.

See also
DSMA-Notice
Freedom of the press
Gag order
Prior restraint
Internet censorship

References 

Censorship
Mass media